Kerstin Marianne Granlund Wedin (born 17 June 1951) is a Swedish revue artist, comedian and actress, who grew up in Trollhättan. She is primarily known as a member of the comedy group Galenskaparna och After Shave.

She is married to Liseberg's former CEO Mats Wedin.

Biography 
Kerstin Granlund had envisioned a career as a psychologist, before Claes Eriksson persuaded her to participate in the student spex Västgötaskoj in 1972. In 1974, she co-founded the spex group Utan lots. Since 1978, she has been part of the group Galenskaparna. She played revue with Hagge Geigert 1976 and 1983. In the summer of 1979 she participated in Sten-Åke Cederhök's Veckans Revy (Weekly Revue) at Liseberg.

As a single woman in Galenskaparna and After Shave Granlund has portrayed a wide range of women's roles. Among her many characters include feat mother in Stinsen brinner, the stripper Agda in Skruven är lös, the American Bonnie Armstrong in Grisen i säcken, the Countess in Alla ska bada, and the Angry lady in En himla många program.

Filmography 
 2006 Den enskilde medborgaren ("The Individual Citizen")
 2000 Gladpack
 1998 Åke från Åstol
 1996 Monopol ("Monopoly")
 1993 Tornado
 1991 Stinsen brinner... filmen alltså ("The Station Master is on Fire... The film, that is")
 1990 Macken - Roy's & Roger's Bilservice ("The Petrol Station - Roy's and Roger's car service")
 1989 En himla många program ("A Lot of Programs")
 1989 Hajen som visste för mycket ("The Shark That Knew Too Much")
 1987 Leif
 1986 The Castle Tour
 1986 Macken ("The Petrol Station")

References

External links 
 
 Kerstin Granlund at Kulturtuben

1951 births
Swedish film actresses
Swedish stage actresses
Swedish television actresses
Swedish women comedians
Galenskaparna och After Shave members
Living people
People from Trollhättan
Musicians from Västra Götaland County
20th-century Swedish actresses
21st-century Swedish actresses
20th-century Swedish comedians
21st-century Swedish comedians